Minkley is a surname. Notable people with the surname include:

Carl Minkley (1866–1937), American interior decorator, housepainter, labor movement activist, and politician 
Gordon Minkley (born 1936), South African cricketer
Harold Minkley (1907–2005), South African cricketer

See also
Minkler (surname)